The Farol da Ponta de São Lourenço (Portuguese for the "lighthouse of Saint Lawrence point") is a lighthouse located on the islet of São Lourenço, marking the extreme east of Madeira Island, Portugal.

The lighthouse was built in 1870 on top of a small extinct volcano and has a focal point of 103 metres. It is the oldest lighthouse in Madeira.

See also

 Video of the lighthouse
 List of lighthouses in Portugal

References

Lighthouses completed in 1870
Lighthouses in Madeira